Heddon may refer to:

Heddon (brand), a brand of fishing lures
Heddon, Devon, a hamlet in England
Heddon (surname)
Heddon-on-the-Wall, a village in Northumberland, England
River Heddon, a river in Devon, England
Black Heddon, a village in Northumberland, England
Heddon Greta, New South Wales, a suburb of the Cessnock LGA, Australia
Heddon's Mouth, a rocky cove on the coast of North Devon, Devon, England

See also 
 Hedon (disambiguation)
 Hendon (disambiguation)